Kampong Serusop is a village in Brunei-Muara District, Brunei, and a neighbourhood in the capital Bandar Seri Begawan. The population was 1,474 in 2016. It is one of the villages within Mukim Berakas 'A'. The postcode is BB2313.

Facilities 
Pengiran Anak Puteri Muta-Wakkilah Hayatul Bolkiah Religious School is the village school for the country's Islamic religious primary education.

The village mosque is Mohamed Bolkiah Mosque; it was inaugurated by Sultan Hassanal Bolkiah on 23 November 1979. The mosque can accommodate 3,000 worshippers.

References 

Neighbourhoods in Bandar Seri Begawan
Villages in Brunei-Muara District